St Augustin's Church is a Grade II listed Gothic Victorian Anglican church in Bournemouth, Dorset, England. The church stands across the A347 road from Wimborne Road Cemetery.

History 
St. Augustin's church was constructed between 1891 and 1892 as a chapel of ease to St. Stephen's. The church was designed by Gothic Revival architect William Butterfield.

Gallery

References

See also 

 List of churches in Bournemouth

Grade II listed churches in Dorset
Church of England church buildings in Dorset
Churches in Bournemouth
Gothic Revival church buildings in England
Gothic Revival architecture in Dorset
Churches completed in 1892
1892 establishments in England
William Butterfield buildings